Aziz is a Hebrew and Arabic male name. In Arabic the feminine form of both the adjective and the given name is Aziza. In Hebrew Aziz is derived from the root עזז meaning "strong, powerful". In Arabic it is derived from the root ʕ-z-z, again meaning "strong, powerful", while the adjective has acquired the meaning of "dear, darling, precious". 
 
In the Old Testament Aziz was the son of Shema and the father of Bela.  In the Latinised form "Azizus" it is attested as the name of one of the Arab  Priest-Kings who ruled Emesa (the modern Homs, Syria) as clients of the Roman Empire.

In ancient Levantine mythology, Azizos or Aziz is the Palmyrene Arab god of the morning star.

The Arabian goddess Al-Uzza, also related to the planet Venus, is named from the same root ʕ-z-z.

Al-Aziz is one of the names of God in Islam. The "Al" makes the word "Aziz" proper. "Aziz" without "Al" is used as a royal title borne by the high nobles of Egypt, being a title borne by the prophet Joseph in the Quranic Surah-e-Yusuf, and also by the Biblical Potiphar, referred to in the Quran as Aziz.

It is used in existing Semitic languages such as Arabic, Assyrian Neo Aramaic, Mandic, Hebrew, and also in non-Semitic languages like Turkish, Kurdish, Armenian, Azerbaijani, Persian, Urdu, Pashtu, Dari, Kazakh, Kyrgyz, Turkmen, Uzbek, Uyghur, Balochi, Bengali, Somali, Indonesian, and Malaysian.

Aziz is a common masculine given name, especially in the Muslim world but it has also continued to be used by non-Muslim peoples in the Middle East, e.g. Assyrians, and Mandeans.

Given name

Azeez
Azeez Abu (born 1994), Nigerian beach soccer player
Azeez Al-Shaair (born 1997), American football player
Azeez Ojulari (born 2000), American football player
Azeez Shobowale Shobola (born 1992), Nigerian footballer

Aziz
Aziz Ansari (born 1983), Indian-American stand-up comedian and actor.
Aziz Azion (born 1984), Ugandan R&B singer-songwriter.
Aziz Behich (born 1990), Australian footballer.
Aziz Ibrahim (born 1964), British guitarist.
Aziz Mian (1942–2000), Pakistani singer.
Aziz Nesin (1915–1995), Turkish humorist and author.
Aziz Sancar (born 1946), Turkish scientist and 2015 Nobel laureate in Chemistry.
Aziz Shavershian (1989–2011), Russian-Australian bodybuilder and internet personality of Kurdish descent.
Aziz Yıldırım (born 1952), Turkish businessman.

Surname

Azeez
A. M. A. Azeez (1911–1973), Ceylonese civil servant, educator, social worker
Ade Azeez (born 1994), English footballer 
Dan Azeez (born 1989), British boxer 
Fatima Azeez (born 1992), Nigerian badminton player
K. P. A. C. Azeez (1934–2003), Indian film actor in Malayalam cinema
Ramon Azeez (born 1992), Nigerian footballer

Aziz
Aaron Aziz (born 1976), Singaporean actor
Arif Aziz (born 1943), Azerbaijan artist and educator
Douglas Aziz (born 1942), Assyrian Iraqi footballer
 Gamal Aziz, also known as Gamal Mohammed he Abdelaziz, Egyptian-American businessman
Lisa Aziz (born 1962), British television presenter and journalism
Michael Aziz, American engineer
Mohamad Aziz, Malaysian politician
Mohammad Aziz, Indian playback singer
Omar Aziz (born 1958), Brazilian politician
Philip Aziz (1923–2009), Canadian artist of Lebanese ancestry
Riza Aziz, Malaysian producer
Shaukat Aziz (born 1949), Pakistani Prime Minister
Tariq Aziz (born Mikhail Yuhanna) (1936–2015), ethnic Assyrian former Iraqi Deputy Prime Minister under Saddam Hussein
Tariq Aziz (field hockey, born 1938) (born 1938), Pakistani field hockey player
Tariq Aziz (TV personality) (1936–2020), Pakistani TV personality
Tipu Aziz (born 1956), Professor of neurosurgery at the John Radcliffe Hospital in Oxford University
 Iqra Aziz (born 1997), Pakistani Actress

See also
Azis (disambiguation)
Aziza (disambiguation) (equivalent feminine name)
Abdul Aziz, Arabic theophoric name
Azziz (disambiguation)
Azizah

References

Arabic masculine given names
Arabic-language surnames
Names of God in Islam
Pakistani masculine given names
Iranian masculine given names

ar:عزيز
bs:Aziz